Lomas de Sargentillo Canton is a canton of Ecuador, located in the Guayas Province.  Its capital is the town of Lomas de Sargentillo.  Its population at the 2001 census was 14,194.

Demographics
Ethnic groups as of the Ecuadorian census of 2010:
Mestizo  60.8%
Montubio  28.4%
Afro-Ecuadorian  6.4%
White  4.3%
Indigenous  0.0%
Other  0.2%

References

Cantons of Guayas Province